The American Foundry Society (AFS) is a professional, technical and trade association for foundries and the broader metal casting industry. The society promotes the interests of foundries to policymakers, provides training for foundry workers, and supports research and technological advancements in foundry science and manufacturing.

AFS represents ferrous and nonferrous foundries based in North America, as well as industry suppliers and end-users of metal castings from around the world. The society has individual and corporate members across 48 countries, organized into regional chapters and student chapters in the United States, Canada and Mexico. AFS presents Metalcasting Congress, a yearly industry conference, as well as CastExpo, a trade show and exposition that occurs every three years.

AFS is based in Schaumburg, Illinois, and also maintains an office in Washington, D.C. Doug Kurkul is CEO of the organization.

History
The American Foundry Society traces its roots to 1896, when the American Foundrymen's Association was formed.

For a number of years prior to the founding of the society, many local bodies of foundrymen met for mutual protection in regard to labor, prices and interchange of technical information. The attendance was usually strong in these organizations in times of prosperity but waned when economic conditions slowed. Early in 1896 the Philadelphia Foundrymen's Society through discussion with its members conceived that a more general, larger benefit might be gained through organizing a wider group of foundrymen. They invited foundrymen from around the country to Philadelphia for a meeting. The response was spontaneous and well received. On May 12, 1896, the American Foundrymen's Association was formed.

The organization's name was subsequently changed to The American Foundrymen's Society. In 2000, it was renamed as the American Foundry Society, or AFS.

Organization
The Society has approximately 930 corporate members and 7,000 individual members. There are 40 regional chapters, as well as 40 student chapters at colleges and universities. AFS is organized into 13 Divisions with committees under each division:

 Engineering Division and Smart Manufacturing
 Additive Manufacturing Division
 Aluminum and Light Metals Division
 Copper Alloy Division
 Molding Methods & Materials Division
 Cast Iron Division
 Melting Methods & Materials Division
 Steel Division
 Environmental, Health & Safety Division
 Lost Foam Division
 Government Affairs Division
 Human Resources Division
 Marketing Division
Women in Metalcasting
Future Leaders of Metalcasting
In addition to these divisions, the organization has technical staff to assist with engineering services, a system to support research, and an extensive library containing more than 15,000 articles available free of charge to all members.

AFS also operates the AFS Institute, previously known as the Cast Metals Institute. The AFS Institute provides classroom training, web courses and e-learning for foundry professionals across all major alloys and foundry processes.

Past Presidents 
 
 2019-2021: Peter Reich, LAEMPE REICH
 2018-2019: Jean Bye, Dotson Iron Castings
 2017-2018: Patricio Gil, Blackhawk de Mexico
 2016-2017: Jeff Cook, Eagle Alloy
 2015-2016: Bruce W. Dienst, Simpson Technologies
 2014-2015: Christopher C. Norch, Denison Industries
 2013-2014: Dennis Dotson, Dotson Iron Castings
 2012-2013: Michael L. Selz, Charlotte Pipe & Foundry
 2011-2012: Tim McMillin, Fairmount Minerals
 2010-2011: Henry W. Lodge, Lodge Manufacturing Company (Lodge (company))
 2009-2010: Steve Reynolds, Lufkin Industries
 2007-2009: Paul Mikkola, Metal Casting Technology Inc.
 2006-2007: Albert Lucchetti, Cumberland Foundry
 2005-2006: James Keffer, EBAA Iron Sales
 2004-2005: Charles M. Kurtti, Neenah Foundry Company
 2003-2004: Arthur Edge, American Cast Iron Pipe Company
 2002-2003: Paul B. Cervellero, Inductotherm
 2001-2002: Donald L. Huizenga, Kurdziel Industries
 2000-2001: Donald E. Gaertner, Metalcasting Equipment Inc.
 1999-2000: Jack Pohlman, Taylor-Pohlman
 1998-1999: Jack Moore, Stahl Specialty Co.
 1997-1998: George Boyd, Sr., Goldens' Foundry
 1996-1997: Henry W. Dienst, Simpson Technologies
 1995-1996: Dwight J. Barnhard, Superior Aluminum Castings
 1994-1995: Thomas E. Woehlke, Lawran Foundry
 1993-1994: Daniel M. Goodyear, Pennsylvania Steel Foundry & Machine
 1992-1993: Ray H. Witt, CMI International
 1991-1992: R. Conner Warren, Citation Corp.
 1990-1991: Jerry Agin, The Hill & Griffith Co.
 1989-1990: James D. Pearson (ACMA Chairman), Aurora Industries
 1989-1990: Alvin W. Singleton, Intermet Corp.
 1988-1989: Tim Hitchcock, Hitchcock Industries
 1987-1988: Albert W. Gruer (ACMA Chairman), Waupaca Foundry
 1987-1988: Anton Dorfmueller, Ashland Chemical
 1986-1987: John L. Kelly, Textron
 1985-1986: William M. O’Neill, Alloy Engineering & Casting Co.
 1984-1985: George N. Booth, Ford Motor Company
 1983-1984: Hugh Sims, Jr., Vulcan Engineering
 1982-1983: Eugene E. Paul, The Dalton Foundries
 1981-1982: Lawrence S. Krueger Pelton Casteel
 1980-1981: Charles E. Drury, Hayes-Albion Corp
 1979-1980: J.R. Bodine, Bodine Aluminum
 1978-1979: John A. Wagner, Jr., Wagner Castings
 1977-1978: Roy Nosek, Beardsley & Piper Div., Pettibone Corp.
 1975-1977: Tom Wiltse, General Motors
 1975: Frank Ryan, St. Paul Brass Foundry
 1974-1975: Charles Fausel, Lester B. Knight & Associates
 1973-1974: Sam Clow, Clow water systems company
 1972-1973: Burleigh E. Jacobs, Grede Foundries
 1971-1972: J. Douglas James, Urick Foundry Co.
 1970-1971: Clyde Sanders, American Colloid
 1969-1970: John O’Meara, Banner Iron Works
 1968-1969: Bernard Ames, Columbian Bronze
 1967-1968: Charles F. Seelbach, Jr., Forest City Foundries
 1966-1967: Dale Hall, Oklahoma Steel Castings
 1965-1966: Warren Jeffrey, McWane Cast Iron Pipe Co.
 1964-1965: Thomas Lloyd, Albion Malleable Iron Co.
 1963-1964: Allen Slichter, Pelton Steel Casting Co.
 1962-1963: John A. Wagner, Wagner Castings Co.
 1961-1962: Albert L. Hunt, Superior Foundry
 1960-1961: Norman Dunbeck, International Minerals & Chemical
 1959-1960: Charles Nelson, Dow Chemical
 1958-1959: Lewis Durdin, Dixie Bronze Co.
 1957-1958: Harry Dietert, Harry W. Dietert Co.
 1956-1957: Frank W. Shipley, Caterpillar Tractor Co.Caterpillar Inc.
 1955-1956: Bruce L. Simpson, National Engineering Co.
 1954-1955: Frank Dost, Sterling Foundry
 1953-1954: Collins Carter, Albion Malleable Iron Co.
 1952-1953: I. Richards Wagner, Electric Steel Castings Co.
 1951-1952: Walter L. Seelbach, Superior Foundry
 1950-1951: Walton Woody, National Malleable & Steel Castings Co.
 1949-1950: E.W. Horlebein, Gibson & Kirk Co.
 1948-1949: W.B. Wallis, Pittsburgh Lectromelt Furnace Co.
 1947-1948: Max Kuniansky, Lynchburg Foundry
 1946-1947: S.V. Wood, Minneapolis Electric Steel Castings Co.
 1945-1946: Fred J. Walls, International Nickel Co.
 1944-1945: Ralph Teetor, Cadillac Malleable Iron Co
 1943-1944: Lee C. Wilson, American Chain & Cable Co.
 1942-1943: D.P. Forbest, Gunite Foundries Corp.
 1941-1942: Herbert S. Simpson, National Engineering Co.
 1940-1941: L.N. Shannon, Stockham Pipe Fitting Co.
 1939-1940: Henry S. Washburn, Plainville Casting Co.
 1938-1939: Marshall Post, Plainville Casting Co.
 1937-1938: H. Bornstein, Deere & Co. John Deere
 1936-1937: James Wick, Jr. Falcon Bronze Co.
 1934-1936: Dan Avey, The Foundry
 1933-1934: Frank Lanahan, Fort Pitt Malleable Iron Co.
 1932-1933: T.S. Hammond, Whiting Corp.
 1931-1932: E.H. Ballard, General Electric Co. General Electric
 1930-1931: Nathaniel Patch, Lumen Bearing Co.
 1929-1930: Fred Erb, Erb-Joyce Foundry Co.
 1928-1929: S.T. Johnson, S. Obermayer Co.
 1926-1928: S. Wells Utley, Detroit Steel Casting Co.
 1925-1926: A.B. Root, Jr., Hunt-Spiller Manufacturing Co.
 1924-1925: L.W. Olson, Ohio Brass Co.
 1923-1924: G.H. Clamer, Ajax Metal Co.
 1922-1923: C.R. Messinger, Chain Belt Co.
 1920-1922: W.R. Bean, Eastern Malleable Iron Co.
 1919-1920: Carl Koch, Fort Pitt Steel Casting Co.
 1918-1919: A.O. Backert, Penton Publishing
 1917-1918: B.D. Fuller, Westinghouse Electric Manufacturing
 1916-1917: J.P. Pero, Missouri Malleable Iron Co.
 1914-1916: Robert Bull, Commonwealth Steel Co.
 1913-1914: Alfred Howell, Phillips & Buttorff  Co.
 1912-1913: Henry Miles, Buffalo Foundry & Machine
 1910-1912: Major Joseph Speer, Pittsburgh Valve Foundry & Construction Co.
 1909-1910: Arthur Waterfall, Russell Wheel & Foundry
 1908-1909: L.L. Anthies, Anthes Foundry Ltd.
 1907-1908: Stanley Flagg, Jr., Stanley G. Flagg & Co.
 1906-1907: William McFadden, Mackintosh, Hemphill Co.
 1905-1906: Thomas West, Thomas D. West Foundry
 1904-1905: Chris Wolff, L. Wolff Manufacturing Co.
 1903-1904: Willis Brown, Walker Foundry
 1902-1903: A.W. Walker, Walker-Pratt Manufacturing Co.
 1901-1902: John Sadlier, Springfield Foundry Co.
 1900-1901: W. A. Jones, W.A. Jones Foundry & Machine Co.
 1899-1900: Joseph S. Seaman, Seaman-Sleeth Co.
 1898-1899: C.S. Bell, C.S. Bell Co.
 1896-1898: Francis Schumann, Tacony Iron & Metal Co.

Regional Activity

Regional Chapters organize educational events and hold chapter meetings, usually at monthly intervals, to promote technical or business subjects related to foundries and the foundry business.

References

External links
 The American Foundry Society
CastExpo 2019
Modern Casting
Casting Source

Related Industry Resources
The Non-Ferrous Founders' Society 
American Iron and Steel Institute (AISI)
Foundrylink
American Iron and Steel Institute (AISI)
Foundry-Planet

Engineering societies based in the United States
Casting (manufacturing)
Manufacturing in the United States
Organizations established in 1896
1896 establishments in the United States